The San José de Apartadó massacre was a massacre of five adults and three children near the small Colombian village of San José de Apartadó more specifically in two places known as "Mulatos" and "La Resbalosa" perpetrated by members of the Military of Colombia and United Self-Defense Forces of Colombia between February 21–22, 2005.

The Community was established on Palm Sunday, March 1997, the villagers declaring themselves neutral in the Colombian armed conflict.

On November 23, 2007, the Attorney General of Colombia ordered the detention of a Colombian National Army Captain, Guillermo Armando Gordillo Sánchez, accused of being the mastermind and perpetrator of the San José de Apartadó massacre. Gordillo-Sánchez was in charge of the unit assigned to the 17th Brigade of the Colombian National Army. On July 18, 2008, the Attorney General signed the complaint against nine military officials for grave violations of human rights and facilitation of the incursion of the United Self-Defense Forces, who carried out the massacre.

See also
List of massacres in Colombia
Javier Giraldo

References

External links
sos-sanjose.org
Colombiasupport.com: San José de Apartadó massacre report
Comunidad de Paz de San José de Apartadó 
Fellowship of Reconciliation (accompanies the community, there immediately after the massacre)
Peace Brigades (accompanies the community, there immediately after the massacre)

Mass murder in 2005
Conflicts in 2005
Massacres in Colombia
Spree shootings in Colombia
Political repression in Colombia
Massacres in 2005
Murder in Colombia
Colombian conflict
Antioquia Department
February 2005 events in South America
2005 murders in Colombia